John Clifford Cherry (born 22 May 1965) was an Australian Democrats senator from 2001 to 2005, representing the state of Queensland and the Queensland Democrats. In March 2005 he became CEO of the Queensland Farmers Federation.

Cherry was born in Kilcoy, Queensland. He studied law and economics at the University of Queensland, culminating in a master's degree in public administration. While at university, he joined the Australian Labor Party. He spent two years as a journalist with the Townsville Bulletin, then worked as an industrial officer with the State Public Services Federation until 1993, when he was appointed economics adviser first to Senator Cheryl Kernot, the then Senate leader of the Australian Democrats, and to her successor Meg Lees. As an adviser to the latter, Cherry was a principal player in negotiations for the 1999 introduction of the Goods and Services Tax (GST), a measure which was a triumph for the Coalition government led by John Howard but which caused a serious split in the Australian Democrats, leading to electoral downturn and loss of the party's Senate representation. He himself was defeated in the 2004 election, ceasing to be a senator on 30 June 2005.

As a senator, Cherry supported protection of Queensland banana growers from potentially diseased imports, conservation of the Great Barrier Reef and superannuation reform to include recognition of same-sex relationships.

Bibliography

References

External links
http://www.democrats.org.au/speeches/index.htm?request=speech+search+results&speaker=81|Senator+John+Cherry Speeches by John Cherry

1965 births
Living people
20th-century Australian politicians
21st-century Australian politicians
Australian Democrats members of the Parliament of Australia
Members of the Australian Senate for Queensland
Members of the Australian Senate
Quarterly Essay people